Sunit Kumar (born 10 November 1955), is a retired Indian Police Service (I.P.S.) officer of Bihar cadre in India, currently serving as Chairman of Bihar Police Subordinate Services Commission (BPSSC) in the state of Bihar. He has also served as Director General of Police in the state of Bihar retiring from service in November 2015. He belongs to the I.P.S. batch of 1980. He has also served as Director of Bihar Police Academy and Chairman of the Bihar Central Selection Board of Constable (CSBC).

Police career

Kumar belongs to the Bihar Cadre of the Indian Police Service (I.P.S.). He has served various districts of Bihar and Jharkhand (erstwhile part of Bihar) as Superintendent of Police. He has also served as Deputy Inspector General of Police (D.I.G.) of Patna Range and Inspector General of Police (I.G.) of Tirhut (Muzaffarpur) Zone.

Apart from active policing in the field Kumar has also served numerous departments of Bihar Police such as Special Branch (Secret Service of State Police), Bihar Military Police (B.M.P.),
 State Crime Records Bureau (S.C.R.B.), Criminal Investigation Department (C.I.D.) and Provisions.

As Superintendent of Police he has served various districts of Bihar and Jharkhand (erstwhile part of Bihar) such as Chaibasa, Naugachiya, Gopalganj, Samastipur, and Gumla etc.

Bihar Police recruitment

From 2008 to November 2015, Kumar was Chairman of the Central Selection Board of Constable in Bihar and has handled recruitment of more than 32,500 Constables into Bihar Police. A number of recruitment drives were conducted by C.S.B.C in these years in order to strengthen the police force in the state. Kumar has been credited with conducting these recruitment drives in an efficient manner which has been marred with corruption in the past.

Apart from police recruitment he has also handled recruitment for Bihar Fire Services, Bihar Home Guards, and the Prisons Department. Around 1,000 firemen for Bihar Government were recruited by C.S.B.C under Kumar.

Bihar Police Subordinate Services Commission

In March 2017 Kumar was appointed as the first Chairman of newly created Bihar Police Subordinate Services Commission (BPSSC) in an order issued by Home Department, Government of Bihar. The service commission was created in order to conduct recruitment examinations and fill vacancies for 19 posts of Group C employees in Government of Bihar.

Awards and honours

Kumar has been awarded the President's Police Medal for Distinguished Service in 2010 on the eve of India's Independence Day. He was also awarded the President's Police Medal for Meritorious Service in 1998.

Personal life

Kumar is married to Kavita Kumar and they have three children. He currently resides in Patna with his wife. Kumar's younger brother is veteran Bollywood actor Vineet Kumar.

References

Indian police officers
People from Bihar
Living people
Bihar cadre civil servants
People from Patna
Patna University alumni
1955 births